Lepa Njiva is a settlement in the Municipality of Mozirje in northern Slovenia. It lies in the hills north of Mozirje. The area is part of the traditional region of Styria. The municipality is now included in the Savinja Statistical Region.

The local church is dedicated to the Mother of God and belongs to the parish of Mozirje. It was first mentioned in written documents dating to 1493. Much of the current building dates to the 18th and 19th centuries.

References

External links
Lepa Njiva on Geopedia

Populated places in the Municipality of Mozirje